is a railway station on the Nippō Main Line in Nobeoka, Miyazaki, Japan, operated by Kyushu Railway Company (JR Kyushu).

Lines
Nobeoka Station is served by the Nippō Main Line. The station was also the terminus of the Takachiho Railway until 2007.

Adjacent stations

History

In 1913, the  had opened a line from  northwards to Hirose (now closed). After the Miyazaki Prefectural Railway was nationalized on 21 September 1917, Japanese Government Railways (JGR) undertook the subsequent extension of the track which it designated as the Miyazaki Main Line. Expanding north in phases, the track reached Nobeoka which was established as the northern terminus on 1 May 1922. By 1923, the track had approached the southern terminus of the then Hoshū Line which JGR had been extending southwards from  down the east coast of Kyushu to reach  by March 1922. The entire stretch of track was then renamed the Nippō Main Line. With the privatization of Japanese National Railways (JNR), the successor of JGR, on 1 April 1987, the station came under the control of JR Kyushu.

A new station building, accompanied by a mixed-use commercial development, opened in August 2017.

See also
 List of railway stations in Japan

References

External links

  

Railway stations in Miyazaki Prefecture
Railway stations in Japan opened in 1922
Nobeoka, Miyazaki